Could It Happen Here? is a 1977 Italian political fiction thriller film written and directed by Massimo Pirri.

Plot 
Rome, 1977. In a  more and more confused climate, between popular discontent and difficulties of the government, a terrorist group is training his men in anticipation of a major military action: the elimination of the Minister of the Interior. At one point, the organization decides to abandon the plan, as it is believed that a massacre would not improve the condition of the poorer classes. But Mara, the daughter of a wealthy businessman, Ferruccio, a young professor, and Bruno, a drifter guy, do not want to withdraw. On their own initiative they will make the attempt, which will be end into a massacre. The minister dies, and with him many members of his entourage as well as the same Bruno. Mara and Ferruccio manage to escape through a Rome becoming lawless. Once in a den they eventually opt to shoot each other, while outside the tanks parading through the streets: the coup started.

Cast 

 Luc Merenda as Ferruccio 
 Marcella Michelangeli as  Mara  
 Andrea Franchetti as  Bruno 
 Lou Castel as Marco  
 Ines Pellegrini as The Student on Park Bench

See also        
 List of Italian films of 1977

References

External links

1977 films
Italian thriller films
Films about terrorism
Films set in 1977
Political fiction
Films set in Rome
Films scored by Lallo Gori
1970s thriller films
1970s Italian-language films
1970s Italian films